The men's sabre was one of seven fencing events on the fencing at the 1948 Summer Olympics programme. It was the eleventh appearance of the event. The competition was held from 12 August 1948 to 13 August 1948. 60 fencers from 24 nations competed. Nations were limited to three fencers each. The event was won by Aladár Gerevich, the fifth of nine straight Games in which a Hungarian would win the event. Gerevich became the third man to win multiple medals in the individual sabre, adding to his 1936 bronze. Vincenzo Pinton of Italy took silver and Pál Kovács of Hungary took bronze; it was the third straight Games where the sabre podium was Hungary-Italy-Hungary.

Background

This was the 11th appearance of the event, which is the only fencing event to have been held at every Summer Olympics. Three of the nine finalists from 1936 returned after the 12-year break: bronze medalist Aladár Gerevich of Hungary, fifth-place finisher Vincenzo Pinton of Italy, and seventh-place finisher Antoni Sobik of Poland. Hungary, dominant in the event since the 1908 Games, was expected to perform well again, led by Gerevich and 1937 world champion Pál Kovács. Aldo Montano of Italy had won the 1938 and 1947 world championships (1939 through 1946 had been cancelled due to World War II) and would have been a favorite, but he did not compete in the individual event, leaving Pinton as the greatest challenger to the Hungarians.

Finland and Peru each made their debut in the men's sabre. Italy and Denmark each made their ninth appearance in the event, tied for most of any nation, each having missed two of the first three events but having appeared every Games since 1908.

Competition format

The competition format was pool play round-robin, with bouts to five touches. Not all bouts were played in some pools if not necessary to determine advancement. Ties were broken through fence-off bouts ("barrages") in early rounds if necessary for determining advancement, but by touches received in final rounds (and for non-advancement-necessary placing in earlier rounds). The fencers from the top four teams in the team sabre event received a bye in the first round.

 Round 1: There 8 pools of between 6 and 7 fencers each. The top 3 fencers in each pool advanced to the quarterfinals.
 Quarterfinals: There were 4 pools of 8 or 9 fencers each. The top 4 fencers in each quarterfinal advanced to the semifinals. (The format was designed for 9 fencers in each pool, but Belgium—which received byes to the quarterfinals—had no individual fencers, so the three pools which would have had Belgian fencers had 8 fencers instead of 9.)
 Semifinals: There were 2 pools of 8 fencers each. The top 4 fencers in each semifinal advanced to the final.
 Final: The final pool had 8 fencers.

Schedule

All times are British Summer Time (UTC+1)

Results

Round 1

The top 3 finishers in each pool advanced to the quarterfinals.

Fencers from the four teams that advanced to the final of the men's team sabre event received byes through round 1, though Belgium had no individual competitors:

 Hungary: Tibor Berczelly, Aladár Gerevich, and Pál Kovács
 Italy: Gastone Darè, Vincenzo Pinton, and Carlo Turcato
 United States: Dean Cetrulo, Tibor Nyilas, and George Worth

Pool 1

Pool 2

Pool 3

Pool 4

Pool 5

Pool 6

Pool 7

Gramain and Zulficar defeated Zaczyk in a three-way barrage for second and third place.

Pool 8

Sarria defeated Eriksson in a barrage for third place.

Quarterfinals

The top 4 finishers in each pool advanced to the semifinals.

Quarterfinal 1

Quarterfinal 2

Quarterfinal 3

Haro defeated Tredgold and Kuijpers in a three-way barrage for fourth place.

Quarterfinal 4

Semifinals

The top 4 finishers in each pool advanced to the final.

Semifinal 1

Semifinal 2

Final

References

Sabre men
Men's events at the 1948 Summer Olympics